Apulco is one of the 58 municipalities in the Mexican state of Zacatecas. It is located on the southern part of the state of Zacatecas and it is bounded by the municipality of Nochistlán de Mejía.

The municipal seat is the city of Apulco.

Population
In the 2005 census Apulco reported a population of 4,801. Of these, 1,453 lived in the municipal seat and the remainder lived in surrounding rural communities.

References

Municipalities of Zacatecas